Gatesclarkeana is a genus of moths belonging to the subfamily Olethreutinae of the family Tortricidae.

Species
Gatesclarkeana batianensis Diakonoff, 1973
Gatesclarkeana confracta Diakonoff, 1973
Gatesclarkeana domestica Diakonoff, 1973
Gatesclarkeana eothina Diakonoff, 1973
Gatesclarkeana erotias (Meyrick, 1905)
Gatesclarkeana idia Diakonoff, 1973
Gatesclarkeana moderatrix Diakonoff, 1973
Gatesclarkeana pachnodes (Meyrick, 1911)
Gatesclarkeana senior Diakonoff, 1966
Gatesclarkeana tenebrosa (Turner, 1916)

See also
List of Tortricidae genera

References

External links
tortricidae.com

Gatesclarkeanini
Tortricidae genera
Taxa named by Alexey Diakonoff